Customized Greatly Vol. 4: The Return of The Boy is the eighth mixtape by American rapper Casey Veggies. It was released on May 20, 2016 by Peas & Carrots Incorporated, Roc Nation and Epic Records. The mixtape contains guest appearances from Tory Lanez, Dom Kennedy, Chris Brown and Ty Dolla Sign, among others.

Release and promotion
On May 10, 2016, Casey Veggies released a trailer for Customized Greatly Vol. 4: The Return of The Boy and the mixtape cover. On May 16, 2016, Casey released a music video of the song, "Choose Up". On May 19, 2016, Casey released the track listing for the mixtape, revealing guest appearances and production.

Track listing

References

2016 mixtape albums
Albums produced by Hit-Boy
Albums produced by Harry Fraud
Roc Nation albums
Epic Records albums
Albums produced by Scoop DeVille
Albums produced by Jake One
Casey Veggies albums
Sequel albums